The 1st constituency of Somme (French: Première circonscription de la Somme) is one of five electoral districts in the department of the same name, each of which returns one deputy to the French National Assembly in elections using the two-round system, with a run-off if no candidate receives more than 50% of the vote in the first round.

Description
The constituency is made up of the eight cantons of Abbeville-Nord, Abbeville-Sud, Ailly-le-Haut-Clocher, Amiens-II-Nord-Ouest, Amiens-IV-Est, Amiens-VIII-Nord, Domart-en-Ponthieu, and Picquigny.

At the time of the 1999 census (which was the basis for the most recent redrawing of constituency boundaries, carried out in 2010) the 1st constituency had a total population of 95,650.

It contains both the town of Abbeville and the northern part of the city of Amiens, the boundary being the course of the River Somme.

Since the defeat of the Gaullist deputy and war hero Fred Moore by the French Communist Party's candidate René Lamps in 1962 the seat has been held continuously by the left.

Historic representation

Election results

2022

 
 
 
 
 
 

 
 
 
 
 

* LREM dissident

2017

 
 
 
 
 
|-
| colspan="8" bgcolor="#E9E9E9"|
|-

2012

 
 
 
 
 
|-
| colspan="8" bgcolor="#E9E9E9"|
|-

2007

 
 
 
 
 
 
 
 
 
|-
| colspan="8" bgcolor="#E9E9E9"|
|-

2002

 
 
 
 
 
 
 
|-
| colspan="8" bgcolor="#E9E9E9"|
|-

1997

 
 
 
 
 
 
 
|-
| colspan="8" bgcolor="#E9E9E9"|
|-

Sources
Official results of French elections from 2002: "Résultats électoraux officiels en France" (in French).

1